In 2017, the Southern Kings participated in the 2017 Super Rugby competition, their third appearance in the competition after also playing in 2013 and 2016.

In April 2017, SANZAAR announced that three clubs would be cut from Super Rugby for the 2018 Super Rugby season, with two of those teams coming from South Africa. On 1 August 2017, the European-based Pro12 announced that the competition would expand to 14 teams — being rebranded the Pro14 — and that the Cheetahs and Kings would be the teams joining the expanded tournament from the 2017–18 season onwards.

Personnel

Coaches and management

The Kings coaching and management staff for the 2017 Super Rugby season were:

Squad

The following players were named in the Kings squad for the 2017 Super Rugby season:

Log

Matches

Player statistics

The Super Rugby appearance record for players that represented the Kings in 2017 is as follows:

 Tango Balekile, Christiaan de Bruin, Siyanda Grey, Cameron Lindsay, Sintu Manjezi, Neil Maritz, Garrick Mattheus, Wandile Putuma and CJ Velleman were included in the 2017 squad, but were never included in a matchday squad.

See also

 Southern Kings
 2017 Super Rugby season

References

2017 Super Rugby season by team
2017 in South African rugby union
2017